Amris (29 December 1957 – 29 April 2021) was an Indonesian politician and general who served as vice mayor of Dumai.

Biography
He retired from the military in 2006. He was then Deputy Mayor of Dumai from 26 February to 29 April 2021.

Amris died of COVID-19 in Pekanbaru on 29 April 2021 at the age of 63.

References

1957 births
2021 deaths
Indonesian politicians
Deaths from the COVID-19 pandemic in Indonesia
People from Bukittinggi
United Development Party politicians